A thumbnail is a reduced-size version of a computer graphic.

Thumbnail may also refer to:

Thumbnail (anatomy), part of the thumb
Thumbnail (album), by AKB48
Thumbnail (cliff), in Greenland

See also
Thumb (disambiguation)
Nail (disambiguation)